Maurice Edward Bailey (born October 30, 1981) is an American-Jamaican former professional basketball player. He played the point guard position.

High school and college career
Born in Bronx, New York, Bailey played his high school basketball at Southside High School in Rockville Centre, New York. He then went on to play college basketball, first with Rider (1999-00), and then with Sacred Heart (2001–04).

Professional career
Bailey began his professional career with the French League club SLUC Nancy in 2004. He then moved to the French club Etendard de Brest in 2005, before returning to SLUC Nancy later that same year. He then moved to the Russian League club Lokomotiv Rostov in 2006.

He joined the Adriatic League club Olimpija Ljubljana in 2007, and he next joined the Russian club Spartak Primorje in 2008. He moved to the Adriatic League club Crvena zvezda in 2009, and he then moved on to the Spanish League club Xacobeo Obradoiro in 2010. Bailey then joined the Greek League club Panellinios. In 2011, he played for Trabzonspor, and in January 2012 he joined Latvian club VEF Rīga.

References

External links
Euroleague.net Profile
Eurobasket.com Profile
Adriatic League Profile
Spanish League Profile 
Greek League Profile 

1981 births
Living people
ABA League players
American expatriate basketball people in France
American expatriate basketball people in Greece
American expatriate basketball people in Latvia
American expatriate basketball people in Russia
American expatriate basketball people in Serbia
American expatriate basketball people in Slovenia
American expatriate basketball people in Spain
Basketball players from New York City
BC Spartak Primorye players
BK VEF Rīga players
KK Crvena zvezda players
KK Olimpija players
Liga ACB players
Obradoiro CAB players
Panellinios B.C. players
PBC Lokomotiv-Kuban players
People from Rockville Centre, New York
Point guards
Rider Broncs men's basketball players
Sacred Heart Pioneers men's basketball players
Shooting guards
SLUC Nancy Basket players
Sportspeople from the Bronx
Trabzonspor B.K. players
American men's basketball players
South Side High School (Rockville Centre) alumni